OMS (aka TeX math symbol) is a 7-bit TeX encoding developed by Donald E. Knuth. It encodes mathematical symbols with variable sizes like for capital Pi notation, brackets, braces and radicals.

Character set

See also 
 OML encoding
 OT1 encoding

References 

Character sets